Louis Polewczynski was a member of the Wisconsin State Assembly.

Biography
Polewczynski was born on April 30, 1899 in Milwaukee, Wisconsin. He would become a machinist.

Political career
Polewczynski was elected to the Assembly in 1926. He was a Republican.

References

Politicians from Milwaukee
Republican Party members of the Wisconsin State Assembly
Machinists
1899 births
Year of death missing